Ain't It Funky is the twenty-seventh full-length studio album by American musician James Brown. The album was recorded between 1966 and 1969 and originally released in January 1970. Tracks 3 to 7 are instrumentals recorded between 1966 and 1969.

Track listing

References

1970 albums
James Brown albums
King Records (United States) albums
Albums produced by James Brown